Germanía is the Spanish term for the argot used by criminals or in jails in Spain during 16th and 17th centuries. Its purpose is to keep outsiders out of the conversation.

Some documentation for it occurs in picaresque works as early as the Spanish Golden Century, such as in Quevedo's El Buscón.  Some writers used it in poetry for comical effect.

After the arrival of the Romani people and their frequent imprisonment, germanía incorporated much vocabulary from Romany and its descendant, the caló jargon. As time passed, several words entered popular use and even standard Spanish, losing their value for secrecy. Germanía  survives today in the cheli jargon.

War of the Germanías

The term germanía ("brotherhood" in Catalan—compare with Galician irmandade and Spanish hermandad) originated from the name of a revolt against the local nobility in Valencia, Spain during the sixteenth century.  Subsequently, the term referred to the argot used by these communities and, eventually, it referred to improper argot.

Use in literature
Characters in the original Spanish version of Arturo Pérez-Reverte's Captain Alatriste series make use of germanía. Pérez-Reverte gave a speech on the subject of germanía to the Real Academia Española de la Lengua after they invited him to join the academy for the work he had done on the series.

Other jargons based on Spanish
 Bron
 Gacería
 Lunfardo (Argentina and Uruguay)
 Quinqui

See also
Thieves' cant
Rotwelsch

References

External links
 Spain 1516–1522: The Troubled Succession of Charles V - Part 9: The Germanía
 Germanía in the RAE dictionary.

Cant languages
Spanish language